Eurasia Aviation Corporation was a Chinese airline headquartered in Shanghai. The company had a Sino-German joint-venture with Deutsche Luft Hansa. Eurasia, classified as a state-owned airline by the Ministry of Communications of China, operated the Junkers W33 and, later, the three-engined Junkers Ju 52.The main fleet base was Hong Kong. When the Japanese began occupying portions of China in the late 1930s, the airline encountered difficulty.

On the day of the Pearl Harbor attack, about a dozen of Imperial Japanese Army Air Force's Ki-36 attack bombers from the 45th Sentai, escorted by nine Ki-27s from the 10th Dokuritsu Hikō Chutai led by Captain Akira Takatsuki, attacked Kai Tak airfield, Hong Kong, destroying many civilian and combat aircraft of the Commonwealth, the CNAC, and three Eurasia Aviation's Junkers 52/3m airliners; these were believed to have been aircraft ‘XIX’ (fmr. D-AGEI), ‘XXII’ (fmr. D-ABIZ) and ‘XXIV’ (fmr. D-AIMP). A fourth Junkers, believed to have been ‘XV’ (fmr. D-ANYK) was undamaged, as was a single Junkers W 34 ‘II’ (fmr. D-7).

Routes
Routes included Shanghai-Lanzhou, Beijing-Ho Nan, Liangzhou-Urumqi, and Shanghai-Manzhouli.

See also
 China National Aviation Corporation
 Civil aviation in China

References

Further reading
 Moeller, Peter and Larry D. Sall. Eurasia Aviation Corporation - A German-Chinese Airline in China and its Airmail 1931-1943. 2007.

External links
 

Companies based in Shanghai
Lufthansa
Defunct airlines of China